Events from the year 1964 in art.

Events
 May – Pablo Picasso paints his fourth Head of a Bearded Man.
 July 28 – Fondation Maeght museum of modern and contemporary art at Saint-Paul-de-Vence in the Alpes-Maritimes of France, designed by Spanish Catalan architect Josep Lluís Sert, is opened.
 The prize for foreign artist at the Venice Biennale is awarded to Robert Rauschenberg.
 David Bailey issues Box of Pin-Ups, a collection of his photographic portraits, in London.
 The National Gallery purchases Rembrandt's painting Belshazzar's Feast from The Art Fund.
 At The Factory, performance artist Dorothy Podber shoots a hole in four Andy Warhol "Marilyn" silk screen paintings, inadvertently transforming them into the works which have come to be known as the Shot Marilyns and is summarily banned from the premises for life. The undamaged example, “Shot Sage Blue Marilyn”, will in 2022 sell at auction for a record price for a 20th-century work sold publicly and for a work by an American artist.

Exhibitions
 November 9–30 – 8 Young Artists exhibition curated by Martin Ries and E. C. Goossen at the Hudson River Museum, Yonkers, New York, including Carl Andre; subsequently travels to Bennington College, Vermont.
 The Post-painterly Abstraction exhibition curated by art critic Clement Greenberg opens at the Los Angeles County Museum of Art and subsequently travels to the Walker Art Center and the Art Gallery of Ontario in Toronto.

Works

 Joseph Beuys – Fat Chair (sculpture)
 Pauline Boty – It's A Man's World
 Montague Dawson – Ariel and Taeping
 Barbara Hepworth – Single Form (United Nations Headquarters)
 Pilkington Jackson – Equestrian statue of Robert the Bruce, Bannockburn
 Jasper Johns – Studio
 Roy Lichtenstein – Oh, Jeff...I Love You, Too...But...
 L. S. Lowry – The Black Church
 René Magritte – The Son of Man
 Ronald Moody – Savacou
 Josef Pillhofer – Reclining Man (Liegender Mann) (sculpture)
 Norman Rockwell
 Growth of a Leader
 The Problem We All Live With
 Gerald Scarfe – drawing of Winston Churchill
 Jean Tinguely – Heureka (kinetic sculpture)
 Andy Warhol
 Electric Chair (screen print)
 Empire (film – made)
 Heinz Tomato Ketchup Box
 Red Jackie
 The Shot Marilyns
 Sleep (film)
 Charles Wheeler – Thomas Paine (gilded bronze, Thetford, England)
 David Wynne – The Beatles (bronzes)

Births
 January 20 – Augusto Ferrer-Dalmau, Spanish Catalan military and historical hyper realist painter
 February 3 – Valérie Belin, French photographer
 April 30 – Kelly Sullivan, American "FingerSmear" painter
 May 17 – Rob Pruitt, American post-conceptual artist
 June 23 – Peter Joyce, English landscape painter
 September 10 – Edmund de Waal, English ceramicist
 October 28 – Onofrio Catacchio, Italian comics artist
 date unknown
 Paul Cadden, Scottish hyperrealist
 Mark Leckey, English visual artist

Deaths
 January 1 – Paul Ninas, American painter (b. 1903)
 January 17 – Đorđe Andrejević Kun, Serbian painter (b. 1904)
 January 26 – Xawery Dunikowski, sculptor (b. 1875)
 January 28 – Marion Dorn (Kauffer), American-born textile designer (b. 1896)
 February 25 – Alexander Archipenko, sculptor (b. 1887)
 February 27 – Orry-Kelly, costume designer (b. 1897; liver cancer)
 March 12 – Jovan Bijelić, Serbian painter (b. 1884)
 March 28 – Vlastislav Hofman, painter, architect (b. 1884)
 April 4 – Seán O'Sullivan, portrait painter (b. 1906)
 April 20 – August Sander, photographer (b. 1876)
 May 9 – Rico Lebrun, Italian-American painter and sculptor (b. 1900)
 June 18 – Giorgio Morandi, still life painter (b. 1890)
 June 24 – Stuart Davis, painter (b. 1892)
 June 26 – Gerrit Rietveld, designer and architect
 July 21 – Jean Fautrier, painter and sculptor (b. 1898)
 August 12 – Ernst Kühnel, German art historian (b. 1882)
 August 31 – Peter Lanyon, landscape painter (b. 1918)
 November 5 – Mabel Lucie Attwell, English illustrator (b. 1879)
 December 29 – Vladimir Favorsky, Russian graphic artist (b. 1886)
 unknown date – Tanasko Milovich, Serbian painter (b. 1900)

See also
 1964 in fine arts of the Soviet Union

References

 
Years of the 20th century in art
1960s in art